Kampung Kayu Ara Pasong is a small village in Pontian District, Johor, Malaysia.

Pontian District
Villages in Johor